Devada is a suburb in Visakhapatnam City, India. It is near the Simhadri Super Thermal Power Station and Vizag Thermal Power Station.

References

Neighbourhoods in Visakhapatnam